This is about the song. For the slapping gesture, see low five.

Soul Shake is the fourth studio album by South African rock band Taxi Violence, released in July 2013.

Reception 
Soul Shake receivedpositive reviews upon its release.

Track listing

References

2013 albums
Taxi Violence albums